Ramon Voorn (born 1 May 1987) is a Dutch professional footballer who plays as a midfielder. He formerly played for MVV, Fortuna Sittard and VVV-Venlo.

External links
 Voetbal International profile 

1987 births
Living people
Dutch footballers
MVV Maastricht players
Fortuna Sittard players
VVV-Venlo players
Eerste Divisie players
Sportspeople from Valkenburg aan de Geul
Footballers from Limburg (Netherlands)
Association football midfielders